Thomas McDonnell Sr. (1788 in County Antrim, Ireland – 13 September 1864 in Onehunga, Auckland) was a timber trader and Additional British Resident in New Zealand. His oldest son was Colonel Thomas McDonnell.

He first arrived in New Zealand, with his family, in 1831 and established a timber-trading business at Horeke on the Hokianga Harbour.
 
He later returned to England and was appointed Additional British Resident in New Zealand in late 1834 or early 1835. He did not arrive back in New Zealand until July 1835. He resigned as Additional Resident just one year later after several disputes with British Resident James Busby.

After ongoing disputes with Māori, other settlers and officials in the Hokianga, McDonnell moved to Whangarei in 1858, and then immediately to Onehunga. He died there after a fall from his horse in 1864.

References
Encyclopedia of New Zealand 1966

1788 births
1864 deaths
People from Auckland
People from the Hokianga